Eva "Lill-Eva" Andersson (born August 15, 1963) is a former Swedish footballer.  Andersson has played for Kubikenborgs IF, GIF Sundsvall, Sundsvalls DFF and Öxabäcks IF. Andersson was a member of the Swedish national team that won the 1984 European Competition for Women's Football.

References

1963 births
Living people
Damallsvenskan players
Sundsvalls DFF players
Öxabäcks IF players
Kungsbacka DFF players
People from Sundsvall
Swedish women's footballers
Sweden women's international footballers
Women's association football midfielders
UEFA Women's Championship-winning players